Tarachoptera is an extinct order of insects, currently solely known from the mid Cretaceous aged Burmese amber. It belongs to Amphiesmenoptera alongside living Lepidopterans (butterflies and moths) and Trichoptera (caddiesflies), but is outside the clade containing the two groups, with an estimated divergence during the Upper Triassic, and therefore over a 100 million year ghost lineage. It currently contains only one family, the Tarachocelidae, which was named in a publication in 2017 a few months before the order itself was published. As the manuscript was in submission, an additional specimen belonging to a new genus justified creating a separate order. Additional species were described in 2018 and 2020. A notable character is the possession of wing scales like members of Lepidoptera, these were initially suggested to have been evolved in parallel evolution from hairs or setae, but a later study suggested that the scales of all amphiesmenopterans are homologous, sharing a common origin. Their flattened morphology and small size suggests they were adapted to living in small crevices; the morphology of the mouth suggests that they were phytophagous, and ingested small particles, perhaps including pollen grains.

Taxonomy 

 Tarachocelis Mey, Wichard, Müller et Wang, 2017
 Tarachocelis microlepidopterella Mey, Wichard, Müller et Wang, 2017
 Kinitocelis Mey, Wichard, Müller et Wang, 2017
 Kinitocelis brevicostata Mey, Wichard, Müller et Wang, 2017
 Kinitocelis divisonotata Mey, Wichard, Müller et Wang, 2017
 Kinitocelis hennigi Mey, Wichard, Müller et Wang, 2017
 Kinitocelis macroptera Mey et al, 2020
 Kinitocelis sparsella Mey et al, 2018
 Kinitocelis dashengi Wang et al. 2022
 Retortocelis Mey et al, 2018
 Retortocelis longella Mey et al, 2018
 Retortocelis minimella Mey et al, 2018
 Retortocelis spicipalpia Mey et al, 2020
 Retortocelis tyloptera Mey et al, 2018

References 

Extinct insect orders
Amphiesmenoptera